This is a list of cities, towns and villages in the province of Friesland, in the Netherlands.

A

B

C

D

E

F

G

H

I

J

K

L

M

N

O

P

Q

R

S

T

U

V

W

Y

Z

Sources 
GEOnet Names Server (GNS)

 
Lists of coordinates
Friesland